Ian Collins may refer to:

 Ian Collins (footballer) (born 1942), Australian businessman and former Australian rules footballer
 Ian Collins (radio presenter) (born 1966), UK radio presenter
 Ian Collins (soccer) (born 1963), soccer coach at the University of Kentucky
 Ian Collins (swimmer) (born 1962), British swimmer
 Ian Collins (tennis) (1903–1975), British tennis player from the 1920s and 1930s

See also
 Collins (surname)